Brycon insignis, the Tiete tetra, is a species of fish in the family Characidae. It is endemic to the Paraíba do Sul River basin in southeast Brazil. B. insignis migrates upstream to spawn and has traditionally been important to fisheries, but it is now a threatened species.

Some authorities recognize B. acuminatus as a separate, possibly extinct species, but recent authorities treat it as a synonym of B. insignis.

References

 

Brycon
Fish of Brazil
Endemic fauna of Brazil
Taxa named by Franz Steindachner
Fish described in 1877
Taxonomy articles created by Polbot